"Pressure" is a song recorded by Dutch DJ and producer Martin Garrix featuring Swedish singer Tove Lo. It was released on 5 February 2021 by Stmpd.

Background and content
On 2 February 2021, Garrix published the cover artwork of "Pressure" on the social media accounts of Stmpd Rcrds before the song's release on 5 February. According to many website's articles, the song possesses a deep melody that matches Tove Lo's "edgy" vocal.

Charts

Weekly charts

Year-end charts

References

2021 songs
2021 singles
Martin Garrix songs
Tove Lo songs
Stmpd Rcrds singles
Songs written by Martin Garrix
Songs written by Tove Lo